Persephin is a neurotrophic factor in the glial cell line-derived neurotrophic factor (GDNF) family. Persephin shares around a 40% similarity in amino acid sequence compared to GDNF and neurturin, two members of the GDNF family.

Function 

Persephin has been found to be less potent than other members of the GDNF family. It has been found to support the survival and morphological differentiation of tyrosine hydroxylase immunoreactive neurons, although less so than both GDNF and neurturin. The mRNA levels of persephin in developing neurons has been low compared to other neurotrophic factors, but relatively higher levels of persephin mRNA have been found in embryonic neurons.

Similarly to the other members of the GDNF family of ligands, persephin uses a receptor that consists of the tyrosine kinase signaling component Ret and a unit of glycosylphosphatidylinsitol (GPI)-anchored receptor (GFRα). Persephin specifically binds to GFRα4.

Persephin acts on both neurons in the CNS and PNS, but also has the ability to act as a renal ramogen.

Structure 
Unlike other GDNF family of ligands, persephin only contains one RXXR cleavage site, rather than multiple, indicating that it can only make one length of functional peptide.

Therapeutics 
Persephin has the potential to be used as a therapeutic treatment for neurodegenerative diseases, such as Parkinson's disease and other diseases that affect motor neurons. Because persephin acts more selectively compared to other GFLs, such as GDNF, it may produce fewer mechanism-based complications, making it a stronger therapeutic target.

References

External links 
 

TGFβ domain
Neurotrophic factors